The Japanese destroyer {{nihongo|Sumire|菫|}} was one of 21 s built for the Imperial Japanese Navy (IJN) in the late 1910s. In 1940, she was decommissioned and then converted into a training ship, before later being re-converted into the auxiliary ship Mitaka (三高) on February 23, 1945. She was finally scrapped in 1948.

Design and description
The Momi class was designed with higher speed and better seakeeping than the preceding  second-class destroyers. Sumire was powered by two Zoelly geared steam turbines, each driving one propeller shaft using steam provided by three Kampon water-tube boilers. Their crew consisted of 110 officers and crewmen.

The main armament of the Momi-class ships consisted of three  Type 3 guns in single mounts; one gun forward of the well deck, one between the two funnels, and the last gun atop the aft superstructure. The guns were numbered '1' to '3' from front to rear. The ships carried two above-water twin sets of  torpedo tubes; one mount was in the well deck between the forward superstructure and the bow gun and the other between the aft funnel and aft superstructure.

Construction and career
Sumire, built at the Ishikawajima shipyard in Tokyo, was laid down on November 24, 1920, launched on December 14, 1921, and completed on March 31, 1923. She serviced in her role for 17 years before being decommissioned on February 1, 1940. She was then converted into a training ship and later re-converted into the auxiliary ship Mitaka (三高) on February 23, 1945. She survived World War II to be surrendered and was scrapped in 1948.

Notes

References

1921 ships
Ships built by IHI Corporation
Momi-class destroyers